The Spy Who Dumped Me is a 2018 American action comedy film directed by Susanna Fogel and co-written by Fogel and David Iserson. The film stars Mila Kunis, Kate McKinnon, Justin Theroux, Sam Heughan, Hasan Minhaj, and Gillian Anderson and follows two best friends who are chased by assassins through Europe after one of their ex-boyfriends turns out to be a CIA agent. The film was released in the United States on August 3, 2018, by Lionsgate and grossed more than $75 million, while receiving mixed reviews from critics, who questioned the film's intended genre and tone but praised the performances.

Plot

In Los Angeles, cashier Audrey Stockman spends her birthday upset after being dumped, via text, by her boyfriend Drew. Her best friend and roommate, Morgan, convinces her to burn his things and sends him a text as a heads up. Audrey has no idea Drew is a government agent being pursued by men trying to kill him. He promises to return and asks her to not torch his stuff in the meantime.

At work, Audrey flirts with a man who asks her to walk him to his car. Forced into a van, the man identifies himself as Sebastian Henshaw. Drew works for the CIA and has gone missing. Audrey claims not to have heard from him and is let go. 

Drew shows up to retrieve his possessions, including a fantasy football trophy. People begin shooting at them and he tells Audrey that, if anything happens to him, she must go to a certain café in Vienna and turn over the trophy to his contact. Drew is then apparently murdered by a man Morgan had taken home from the bar, whom she then pushes off the balcony.

Morgan convinces Audrey to go to Vienna. At the café, Sebastian appears and demands the trophy at gunpoint. Audrey reluctantly hands it over before the entire café is attacked. The friends flee, chased by men on motorcycles. Audrey reveals that she still has Drew's trophy as she'd switched it with one of several decoys they purchased. Boarding a train to Prague, they discover the trophy contains a USB flash drive. Morgan calls her parents, who tell her they can stay in Prague with family friend Roger. 

Audrey and Morgan get to the apartment, but discover "Roger" is actually a spy who has killed the real Roger and drugged the two ladies. Audrey tries to get Morgan to swallow the flash drive. When that fails, Audrey tells their captors that she flushed it down the toilet.

The ladies wake up in an abandoned gymnastics training facility, about to be tortured by Nadejda, a Russian gymnast/model/assassin trained by the older couple who had previously masqueraded as Drew's parents. Audrey and Morgan are rescued by Sebastian, who defied orders to save them. He brings them to his boss in Paris, where they once again tell the CIA and MI6 that the drive was flushed. The women are given tickets back to America, and Sebastian is suspended.

Driving back to the airport, Sebastian explains that Drew's "parents" are actually notorious criminals; Drew was discreetly negotiating with them to sell the USB, and Audrey was part of his cover. Audrey confesses that she hid the drive in her vagina. When Sebastian cannot decrypt the information, Morgan calls Edward Snowden - who had a crush on her in summer camp - and he helps them hack the drive.

The trio travel to a hostel in Amsterdam, where they are attacked by Sebastian's CIA partner Duffer, who plans to sell the drive himself. They are rescued by their hostel roommate, who thinks they are being robbed and body slams Duffer to his death. Audrey answers Duffer's phone when it rings and agrees to sell the drive at a private party in Berlin. 

To get into the party, Audrey and Sebastian go as the Canadian ambassador and his wife, while Morgan joins the Cirque du Soleil crew. Sebastian is attacked and Morgan is confronted by Nadejda on an acrobat swing, eventually throwing her to her death. Meanwhile, Audrey meets her mysterious contact and finds Drew, still alive. Drew acts suspiciously and goes through her purse to find the USB. Sebastian arrives, being held hostage by Drew's "parents". 

After a standoff, Drew's "parents" are shot, leaving Sebastian and Drew, who accuse each other of trying to hurt Audrey. Drew then shoots Sebastian, and Audrey pretends to be glad before grabbing his gun. When Drew tries to attack her, she kicks him in the crotch. Once he's on the ground, Morgan throws a cannonball at him. Drew is arrested, and Audrey, Morgan, and Sebastian walk away.

Sebastian later gives Morgan his untraceable phone to let her parents know she is alive. While on the phone, she receives a call from Sebastian's boss telling him he is off suspension. Morgan begs her for a job as a spy. Meanwhile, Sebastian and Audrey kiss.

A year later, while celebrating Audrey's birthday in Tokyo, her party is revealed to be ruse. She and Morgan are on assignment with Sebastian to stop a group of Japanese Yakuza gangsters.

Cast
 Mila Kunis as Audrey Stockman
 Kate McKinnon as Morgan Freeman
 Sam Heughan as Sebastian Henshaw
 Justin Theroux as Drew Thayer
 Gillian Anderson as Wendy
 Hasan Minhaj as Duffer
 Ivanna Sakhno as Nadejda
 Fred Melamed as Roger
 Jane Curtin as Carol Freeman
 Paul Reiser as Arnie Freeman
 Lolly Adefope as Tess Baker-Tonetti
 Kev Adams as Bitteauto Driver Lukas
 Olafur Darri Olafsson as Finnish Backpacker
 Tom Stourton as Edward Snowden
 James Fleet as Tom
 Carolyn Pickles as Marsha
 Mirjam Novak as Verne

Production
Principal photography began in Budapest, Hungary in July 2017. Filming also took place in Amsterdam that September, wrapping the same month.

Release
The Spy Who Dumped Me premiered at Regency Village Theater in Los Angeles on July 25, 2018. The film was originally scheduled to be released on July 6, 2018, but after "a phenomenal test screening" it was pushed back a month to August 3, 2018, in order to avoid a crowded July frame.

Home media
The Spy Who Dumped Me was released on DVD and Blu-ray on October 30, 2018, by Lionsgate Home Entertainment.

Reception

Box office
The Spy Who Dumped Me grossed $33.6 million in the United States and Canada, as well as $41.7 million in other territories, for a total worldwide gross of $75.3 million, against a production budget of $40 million.

In the United States and Canada, The Spy Who Dumped Me was released alongside Christopher Robin, The Darkest Minds and Death of a Nation: Can We Save America a Second Time?, and was projected to gross $10–15 million from 3,111 theaters in its opening weekend. The film made $5 million on its first day, including $950,000 from Thursday night previews. It went on to debut to $12.4 million, finishing third at the box office, behind holdover Mission: Impossible – Fallout and Christopher Robin. It fell 45% to $6.6 million in its second weekend, finishing sixth.

Critical response
At the film review aggregator website Rotten Tomatoes, the film holds an approval rating of 49% based on 208 reviews, with an average rating of 5.30/10. The website's critical consensus reads, "The Spy Who Dumped Me isn't the funniest or most inventive spy comedy, but Kate McKinnon remains as compulsively watchable as ever". On Metacritic, the film has a weighted average score of 52 out of 100, based on 43 critics, indicating "mixed or average reviews". Audiences polled by CinemaScore gave the film an average grade of "B" on an A+ to F scale, while PostTrak reported filmgoers gave it 3 out of 5 stars.

Varietys Owen Gleiberman praised McKinnon's performance but criticized the film for favoring violence over comedy, writing, "The Spy Who Dumped Me is no debacle, but it's an over-the-top and weirdly combustible entertainment, a movie that can't seem to decide whether it wants to be a light comedy caper or a top-heavy exercise in B-movie mega-violence." Barbara VanDenburgh of The Arizona Republic called the film "a tonally incongruous, plodding and graphically violent comedy" and gave the film 2 out of 5 stars, saying: "Perhaps the problem isn't one of too little ambition, but of too much. The Spy Who Dumped Me is, after all, trying earnestly to be about half a dozen different things: a buddy comedy, a spy drama, a raunch fest, a thrilling action film. It's just that it doesn't have the focus to do any of those things particularly well". Rolling Stones Peter Travers criticized the film, rating it 2 out of 5 stars. He stated that the film "spends way too much time on car chases, shootouts, knife fights and R-rated violence that doesn't square with the film's comic agenda" and also commented that "The Spy Who Dumped Me isn't just painfully unfunny—it criminally wastes the comic talents of Kate McKinnon".

Richard Brody of The New Yorker praised the film, stating, "Mila Kunis and Kate McKinnon riff gleefully in the ample and precise framework of Susanna Fogel's effervescent action comedy", while Justin Chang of the Los Angeles Times also gave it a positive review, writing, "The Spy Who Dumped Me [is] a fast, funny Europe-trotting buddy caper".  Johnny Oleksinski of The New York Post opined it was nice to see McKinnon used properly in a film, and that Kunis was the ideal straight woman, calling the two a smart match.

Accolades

References

External links
 
 

2010s action comedy films
2010s black comedy films
2010s buddy comedy films
2010s spy comedy films
American action comedy films
American black comedy films
American female buddy films
American spy comedy films
American buddy comedy films
Films set in Amsterdam
Films set in Berlin
Films set in Lithuania
Films set in Los Angeles
Films set in Paris
Films set in Prague
Films set in Vienna
Films shot in Amsterdam
Films shot in Atlanta
Films shot in Berlin
Films shot in Budapest
Films shot in Prague
Films shot in Vienna
Imagine Entertainment films
Lionsgate films
Cultural depictions of Edward Snowden